The 1995 Giro d'Italia was the 78th edition of the Giro d'Italia, one of cycling's Grand Tours. The field consisted of 198 riders, and 122 riders finished the race.

By rider

By nationality

References

Teams
1995